The British National Circuit Race Championships cover several different categories of British road bicycle racing events, normally held annually. The first championships were held in 1979 for professional cyclists only. Amateur championships were introduced in 1993 but only 3 of these were held as the amateur and professional championships were combined into an open event in 1996. Women's championships were not held until 1998.

Men

Senior (1996–)

Amateur (1993–1995)

Professional (1979–1995)

Junior

Under 16

Under 14

Women

1998–

Under 16

Under 14

Notes

References

Men's Circuit Race Champions 1979-2007, British Cycling
Women's Circuit Race Champions 1998-2006, British Cycling
2007 Results (Women)
2007 Results (Seniors)
2007 Results (Juniors)
2006 Results (Juniors)
2004 Results (Seniors)
2004 Results (Juniors)
2003 Results (Juniors)
2002 Results (Women)
2002 Results (Seniors)
2002 Results (Juniors)
2001 Results (Women)
2001 Results (Seniors)
2001 Results (Juniors)
2000 Results (Women)
2000 Results (Seniors)
2000 Results (Juniors)
1999 Results (Women)
1999 Results (Seniors)
1999 Results (Juniors)
1998 Results (Women & Juniors)
1998 Results (U16)
2008 Results (Youth)
2008 Results (Seniors)
2008 Results (Women)
2009 Results (Seniors)
2009 Results (Women)
2009 Results (Youth)

Cycle racing in the United Kingdom
National road cycling championships
National championships in the United Kingdom